Anna Höstman (born 1972 in Port Hardy, British Columbia) is a Canadian composer. She currently lives in Victoria, British Columbia.

Höstman studied with John Celona, Christopher Butterfield, Gordon Mumma at the University of Victoria and Gary Kulesha at the University of Toronto.

From 2005-2008 she was Composer-in-Residence with the Victoria Symphony. and she has since written 6 pieces for the orchestra, including a flute concerto for Mark McGregor.

Höstman has written music for film, including the music for From Harling Point, a National Film Board of Canada documentary about a Chinese cemetery in BC, directed by Ling Chiu.

Höstman's opera, What time is it now? was based on an original libretto by P.K. Page, performed by the Victoria Symphony and recorded by CBC Radio. It is a chamber opera for three singers and six players about a woman with dementia.

Höstman's large-scale work, Nuyamł-ił Kulhulmx (Singing the Earth): 11 Pieces about a Place, makes use of historical and contemporary sources in four languages (Nuxalk, Norwegian, English and Japanese) in the creation of an artistic response to the isolated landscape and culture of Bella Coola. The piece was made in collaboration with Dylan Robinson, Marion Newman, Patrick Nickelson and was performed by Continuum Ensemble. It will be performed again in 2019 by the Victoria Symphony.

Höstman has also collaborated with the Quatuor Bozzini, and her piece Slanted Birds appears on their CD, À chacun sa miniature.

Höstman also interviews Canadian composers for TEMPO, and has so far interviewed Linda Catlin Smith and Christopher Butterfield.

Recognition 
In 2013, Höstman won the Toronto Emerging Composers' Award

In 2021, Höstman was nominated for a Juno Award for Classical Composition of the year for Harbour.

List of selected works

Opera 

 What time is it now? for 3 vocal soloists, 6 players (2006)

Orchestra 

 Drømde mik en drøm i nat (2013)
 Emily’s Piece (2011)
 Snow Variations (2009)
 Trace the Gold Sun, flute concerto (2008)

Chamber music 

 tributary, for violin, bass clarinet and piano (2018)
 Float (2017) 
 Fog (2015)
 Lehtiä (2014)

Instrumental solo 

 Vines and Shadows, harpsichord (2016)
 Water Walking, violin (2016) written for Mira Benjamin
 Harbour, piano (2016)

Writing 

 Höstman, A. (2017). 'My garden is not pristine': an interview with Linda Catlin Smith. Tempo, 71(280), 8-20. doi:10.1017/S0040298217000055
 Höstman, A. (2017). My world as I remember it: an interview with Christopher Butterfield. Tempo, 71(282), 6-17. doi:10.1017/S0040298217000572
 Höstman, A. (2016). Tuber, rhizome, tendril and corm: on the music of Martin Arnold. Tempo, 70(277), 16–33. doi:10.1017/S0040298216000164

References

External links 
 Listening to Ladies: The Podcast
 Official website
 Ludwig-van Interview

1972 births
Living people
Musicians from British Columbia
People from the Regional District of Mount Waddington
21st-century Canadian composers
21st-century women composers
Canadian women composers
21st-century Canadian women musicians